William Edward Nairn (1812 – 9 July 1869) was an English-born politician in Australia, president of the Tasmanian Legislative Council.

Born in Widcombe, Somerset, England, Nairn was the only son of Captain William Nairn and his wife Mary Ann. W. E. Nairn studied at Lincoln College, Oxford (B.A., 1833), and was granted a license to trade on a schooner his father had purchased for trade on the Tasmanian coast.

Nairn emigrated to Tasmania with Sir John Franklin, arriving in Hobart in February 1837 aboard the Fairlie. In June 1837 Nairn was appointed clerk in the Colonial Secretary's Office. He was made Secretary to the Board of Education in 1839. He was elected to the Tasmanian Legislative Council, becoming its president in September 1859. In September 1868 he took sick leave but did not recover. He died at Hobart on 9 July 1869, survived by his wife Maria, née Swan.

References

1812 births
1869 deaths
Presidents of the Tasmanian Legislative Council
Members of the Tasmanian Legislative Council
Alumni of Lincoln College, Oxford
People from Somerset
English emigrants to colonial Australia
19th-century Australian public servants
19th-century Australian politicians